was a Japanese politician serving in the House of Representatives in the Diet (national legislature) as a member of the Democratic Party of Japan. He was born in Jilin, China on 10 June 1942, then part of Manchukuo. A graduate of Keio University he was elected for the first time in 1976 after an unsuccessful run in 1972.

Nakai died on 22 April 2017 from stomach cancer at the age of 74.

References

External links 
  in Japanese.

1942 births
2017 deaths
Deaths from cancer in Japan
Deaths from stomach cancer
Politicians from Changchun
Keio University alumni
Members of the House of Representatives (Japan)
Ministers of Justice of Japan
Members of Nippon Kaigi
Democratic Party of Japan politicians
21st-century Japanese politicians